"Look Alive" is a song by American rapper BlocBoy JB featuring Canadian rapper Drake. It is released as the first single off BlocBoy JB's mixtape Simi. The song was produced by Tay Keith.  It debuted at number six and later peaked at number five on the US Billboard Hot 100, which makes it the first top 10 single for BlocBoy JB and 23rd for Drake.

Music video
The music video of the song was released on February 8, 2018. It features BlocBoy JB, Drake, Tay Keith, rappers Moneybagg Yo and Quando Rondo, former Memphis Grizzlies forward Zach Randolph, and their crew at various locations in Memphis. The video has gained more than 358 million YouTube views as of March 2022.

Remix
On February 11, 2018, British rapper Scarlxrd released a remix of the song and titled it “LXXK DEAD”.

On March 4, 2018, rapper Joyner Lucas released a remix onto SoundCloud and YouTube.

On March 24, 2019, Australian rapper Fortay released a remix of "Look Alive" using the same beat, but new lyrics.

Charts

Weekly charts

Year-end charts

Certifications

|-
! scope="row"| Portugal (AFP)
|Gold
|5,000
|-

References

2018 songs
2018 singles
BlocBoy JB songs
Drake (musician) songs
Trap music songs
Hardcore hip hop songs
Gangsta rap songs
Songs written by Drake (musician)
Song recordings produced by Tay Keith
Songs written by Tay Keith